Nuridah binti Mohd Salleh is a Malaysian politician who served as Senator from 2018 to 2022 and Dewan Muslimat PAS Chief from 2007 to 2011 and since 2015.

Election results

Honours
  :
  Companion of the Order of the Defender of the Realm (JMN) (2021)

References

Living people
1961 births
Malaysian Islamic Party politicians
Members of the Dewan Negara
Women members of the Dewan Negara
21st-century Malaysian women politicians
21st-century Malaysian politicians
Companions of the Order of the Defender of the Realm